Satya Wacana Christian University, or Universitas Kristen Satya Wacana (UKSW), is a private university located in Salatiga, Central Java, Indonesia. The name itself is derived from Sanskrit, meaning "Faithful to the Word / Word of God". UKSW's campuses are spread all-around Salatiga.

History
SWCU was established as the College for Christian Teachers (PTPGKI) on November 30, 1956, by 9 Indonesian church synods. At the time of inception there were 5 studies: Teaching & Education, History, English, Law, and Economics. On July 17, 1959 PTPGKI changed to Christian Faculty of Teaching and Education Indonesia (FKIP-KI) and on December 5, 1959 FKIP-KI was christened as Satya Wacana Christian University.

Programs offered
The university has of 14 faculties providing 4 diplomas courses, 39 undergraduate courses, 10 graduate courses and 3 postgraduate courses. Some graduate and postgraduate courses are managed by the separate postgraduate program.

Collaboration
SWCU collaborates with the following foreign tertiary educational institutions:
 Universidade Da Paz
 Mennonite Central Committee
 University of Glasgow
 Evangelical Lutheran Church in America
 Kwansei Gakuin University
 Valparaiso University
 Christian University of Thailand
 East Timor Democratic Republic
 Chang Jung Christian University
 World Links Education Pty Ltd
 Omron
 Arizona State University
 Beloit College
 Luther Seminary
 St. Olaf College
 Griffith University
 Southern Cross University
 University of Western Sydney
 Charles Darwin University
 Seagate Technology
 Mennonite Church in the Netherlands
 Christelijke Hogesschol-Leeuwarden
 Educate Facultiet Amsterdam (Amsterdam Faculty of Education)
 Presbyterian Church in Ireland
 Passau University
 Vrije University
 Ateneo de Manila University
 Chung Yuan Christian University
 Hyugo University Mobility in Asia Pacific
 The Presbyterian Church of Korea
 Australian National University
 World Links Education Pty Ltd
 Queensland University of Technology
 Evangelical Lutheran Church in Indonesia
 National University of East Timor

References

External links
 Official website
 Faculty of Electrical Engineering founding history

Salatiga
Universities in Central Java
Christian universities and colleges
Association of Christian Universities and Colleges in Asia
Private universities and colleges in Indonesia